Allocasuarina pusilla, commonly known as the heath oak-bush or the dwarf she-oak, is a species of Allocasuarina genera native to Australia.

It is found in sandy soils of south eastern South Australia extending into western Victoria.

References

External links
  Occurrence data for Allocasuarina pusilla from The Australasian Virtual Herbarium

pusilla
Fagales of Australia
Flora of South Australia
Flora of Victoria (Australia)
Dioecious plants